Fictional geography is the use of maps, text and imagery to create lands and territories to accompany works of fiction. Depending on the completeness and complexity of the work, varying media, levels of collaboration and a number of other factors, the depiction of geographical components to works of fiction can range from simple drawings of a small area as in The Twenty-One Balloons by William Pène du Bois to an entire fictional world as in The Lord of the Rings by Tolkien or even an entire galaxy as in Star Trek and its variants.

Examples

See also
List of fictional location types
Worldbuilding

 geography
Geography
Worldbuilding